Veronica Degraffenreid is an American election official serving as the special advisor on election modernization in the Pennsylvania Department of State. After it was announced that Commonwealth Secretary Kathy Boockvar would resign from her position on February 5, 2021, Degraffenreid was announced as her successor.

Background 
Degraffenreid earned a Bachelor of Arts degree in economics from the University of North Carolina at Chapel Hill. She worked as a litigation specialist at Poyner Spruill LLP and the North Carolina Department of Justice before becoming director of election operations for the North Carolina State Board of Elections. Degraffenreid has been cited as an expert on election modernization and voting technology.

References 

21st-century African-American people
21st-century African-American women
African-American people in Pennsylvania politics
African-American state cabinet secretaries
Living people
Secretaries of the Commonwealth of Pennsylvania
University of North Carolina at Chapel Hill alumni
Women in Pennsylvania politics
Veronica
Year of birth missing (living people)